Mount Hubble is a mountain rising to  between Mount Field and Mount Dick in the Churchill Mountains of Antarctica. It was named after American astronomer Edwin Powell Hubble of the Carnegie Institution of Washington's Mount Wilson Observatory, 1919–53; in 1923 he furnished the first certain evidence that extragalactic nebulae were situated far outside the boundaries of our own galaxy, in fact were independent stellar systems.

References

Mountains of Oates Land